is a 2008 Japanese science fiction comedy-drama film directed by Kwak Jae-yong, starring Haruka Ayase and Keisuke Koide.

Plot 
It is 22 November 2007. Jiro Kitamura (Keisuke Koide) is spending his 20th birthday alone. As he buys a birthday present for himself in a shopping mall, he gets the attention of a 'cute girl' (Haruka Ayase) and she surprisingly smiles at him. Afterwards, she successfully steals a pair of clothes, which Jiro notices, but he ignores it as she walks away in front of him and he is distracted by her beauty. The mystery girl, who seems to be interested in him, follows him to a restaurant, where he eats spaghetti on the advice of his grandmother (later revealed to be his mother who gave birth to him in old age) for a longer and peaceful life. She suddenly appears and sits with him, stating that it's 'her birthday too'. The two of them then exchange birthday presents. The girl, who seems unused to everything, behaves very boldly and suddenly rushes with Jiro out of the restaurant without paying the bill, provoking the manager to chase the two through Tokyo. As he spends time with the girl, Jiro finds himself charmed by her. But, after a few hours, the girl insists she has to leave and goes with a tearful goodbye.

The story then jumps to one year later, as Jiro again celebrates his birthday alone in the same restaurant. All of a sudden, the same-looking girl appears in front of him. Jiro's older self from 65 years in the future had sent this girl to save him from a disastrous fate. She was actually a cyborg, modelled after the girl he met a year before in 2007. While he rejoices in her presence, the restaurant is suddenly attacked by a gunman, but she saves him and the other guests by throwing the gunman out of the window. Despite her 'cute' outward appearance, she is incredibly strong and behaves erratically. Later, in Jiro's home, she reveals her true identity by showing him a 3D projection of a video in which an elderly Jiro from the future warns him about an upcoming disaster. The old Jiro told him that the shooting at the restaurant paralyzed him for life. However, a lottery ticket he bought earlier was fortunate for him. He spent all his time and money on one thing: creating the cyborg girl to save his past self about 60 years ago. Now, he has recreated the history of his timeline by sending her. This was not supposed to happen, but things would correct themselves by recalibrating to the right dimension. In a short span of time, she becomes Jiro's protector as well as a loyal friend and they both share some wonderful moments. She also saves many other lives from tragic deaths that old Jiro had regretted witnessing.

Over time, Jiro not only becomes dependent on, but also falls in love with her. However, when she cannot return his feelings, he gets irritated and forbids her from seeing him unless she can do so. He begins to regret this, especially when it becomes apparent that she is still helping him while staying out of his sight. Another disaster soon occurs: a gigantic earthquake completely devastates Tokyo. As his apartment block collapses, she appears to help him, but even her superhuman strength isn't enough to save him. After telling Jiro that she now understands his feelings, she is destroyed while saving him. Later, distraught, Jiro finds her body and spends the next 61 years trying to rebuild her. He eventually succeeds but dies shortly after.

Further in the future (63 years later) in 2133, a girl is told by her friend that there is a cyborg on display that looks just like her. She is curious, and buys the now defunct cyborg to experience the memories stored in her hard-drive. Intrigued, she then decides to fulfil her wish of going back in time to meet Jiro. She is revealed to be the actual girl who met Jiro on his 20th birthday (22 November 2007), who did so because she wanted to meet him before the cyborg did. After the events of the story, she comes again to the moment when Jiro weeps over the destroyed body of the cyborg. She then says "I can feel his heart," and decides to live with Jiro from then on, changing his fate again.

Timelines 
While revealed dramatically in different manners throughout the film, the narrative includes three distinct timelines that intertwine to form the full story.

Timeline 1 
On his 20th birthday (22 November 2007),
Jiro is visited by a mysterious girl who charms him,
but leaves suddenly after telling him that the man living in Jiro's house jilted her.
Jiro buys a lottery ticket shortly before his 21st birthday (22 November 2008).
On that day, he is tragically shot and wounded by a crazed gunman at the Italian restaurant.  
Although paralyzed for the rest of his life, 
he is able to fulfill his childhood promise to his (grand)mother and become a scientist, 
using his lottery winnings to create a cyborg in the perfect image of the girl who charmed him on his 20th birthday.
From his high-tech wheelchair complete with robotic arms,
he records a message to his younger self, 
embeds the message in the cyborg, and 
sends her back to 22 November 2008 to meet himself on his 21st birthday and prevent the shooting.

Timeline 2 
On his 21st birthday (22 November 2008),
he is suddenly visited by the same girl from one year earlier, who now rescues him from the shooting
and proves to be a cyborg.
Jiro spends some amount of time with the cyborg (probably many weeks),
falls in love with her, but sends her away in a drunken rage,
only to be rescued again by her in the Tokyo earthquake where she perishes.  
Jiro takes possession of the cyborg torso and spends the rest of his life reconstructing her and builds several exact copies.
The cyborg is finally able to "feel his heart" and Jiro (this time in a normal wheelchair) dies happy.  
Decades later, the cyborg girl ends up in a museum where a human girl who looks just like her learns their story (via Jiro's writings also acquired by the museum).
A few years later, the human girl's rich father helps her purchase the cyborg in an auction.
Using that future's technology, she downloads the cyborg's memories into her own brain.  
She falls in love with the memories of Jiro and obtains special permission to use a time machine to visit the past for a few hours.
She travels back in time to Jiro's 20th birthday (22 November 2007) when she charms him but tearfully must leave him due to the limitations of that time trip.

Timeline 3 
After returning to her own time in the future, the human girl again uses the time machine,
this time returning to the exact point in time when Jiro finds the cyborg torso in the ruins of Tokyo.
She announces that she has decided to live the rest of her life in young Jiro's timeline.

Cast
 Haruka Ayase as the girl, a unnamed girl who suddenly appeared before Jiro whilst he was celebrating his birthday alone
 Ayase also portrays the cyborg girl, the unnamed cyborg who the future Jiro sent back in time to protect his younger self from a terrible fate
 Ayase also portrays the future girl, who learns about the cyborg girl's past, and travels back into 2007 where she meet Jiro
 Keisuke Koide as Jiro Kitamura, a university student who has bought a present for himself and gone to eat spaghetti at the same restaurant every year for his birthday.
 Kenta Kiritani as  Kenta Sato, Jiro's friend
 Kazuko Yoshiyuki as Jiro's mother
 Hiromasa Taguchi as the unnamed shooter, who seemingly lost his mind in the restaurant on 22 November 2008

Adaptions 
A manga adaptation by Akihiro Nakamura was released on 17 October 2008. Based on the film, it was published in Kodansha's Young Magazine.

References

External links 
  
 

2008 romantic comedy-drama films
2000s science fiction comedy-drama films
2008 films
Android (robot) films
Cyborg films
Japanese disaster films
Films directed by Kwak Jae-yong
Japanese romantic comedy-drama films
Japanese science fiction comedy-drama films
2000s Japanese-language films
Next Entertainment World films
2000s romantic fantasy films
Films about time travel
Films set in 2007
Films set in 2008
Films set in 2009
2000s Japanese films